Eburnamine is an indole alkaloid in the aspidosperma group.  It has anticholinergic activity.

External links

Tryptamine alkaloids
Indoloquinolizines
Quinolizidine alkaloids